Fabien Anselmet (born 12 November 1960) is a French ski mountaineer and skiing instructor.

Selected results 
 2007:
 1st, Trace de Vaugel A course (together with Sébastien Baud)
 3rd, European Championship relay race (together with Yannick Buffet, Bertrand Blanc and Tony Sbalbi)
 7th, Trofeo Mezzalama (together with Lionel Bonnel and Sébastien Baud)
 8th, Martial Premat team race (together with Martial Premat)

Pierra Menta 

 2004: 10th, together with Jean-Marcel Grillet
 2007: 9th, together with Sébastien Baud

References

External links 
 Photo

1960 births
Living people
French male ski mountaineers